Gliophorus lilacipes is a species of agaric fungus in the family Hygrophoraceae. Found in New Zealand, it was described by Egon Horak in 1973.

References

External links

Hygrophoraceae
Fungi described in 1973
Fungi of New Zealand
Taxa named by Egon Horak